Jacek Roszko and Kamil Kryński are the premier sprinters running for KS Podlasie Białystok (KS stands for "Klub Sportowy" or "Sports' Club"), and are a part of the new wave of the Polish sprinters who are chasing the dream of improving Marian Woronin's Polish national record over 100m of  10.00 s (9.998s) as well as the first European class sprinters from Podlasie.

Born 1987-11-08
Personal Best over 60m 6.64s (2009)
Personal Best over 100m 10.39s (2007)
Personal Best over 200m 22.02s (2007)

External links
(Under Construction) http://vincovitanj.tripod.com/podlasie

References

1987 births
Living people
Polish male sprinters
People from Mońki
Sportspeople from Mońki
Podlasie Białystok athletes